Acacia retinodes is an evergreen shrub that is native to South Australia, Victoria and Tasmania. Short racemes of yellow flowers are produced periodically throughout the year.  Some common names are Retinodes water wattle, swamp wattle, wirilda, ever-blooming wattle and silver wattle.

Description
It has furrowed bark with a rough texture that is dark brown to black in colour. It has glabrous branchlets that are sometimes pendulous or angular or flattened at extremities. Like most species of Acacia it has phyllodes rather than true leaves. The green to grey-green, glabrous and variable phyllodes are quite crowded on stems and have a narrowly oblanceolate to oblanceolate to linear shape. It mostly blooms in summer between December and February.

Taxonomy
The species was first formally described by the botanist Diederich Franz Leonhard von Schlechtendal in 1847 as part of the work Sudaustralische Pflanzen. II. Bestimmung und Beschreibung der von Dr Behr in Sudaustralien gesammelten Pflanzen as published in the journal Linnaea: ein Journal für die Botanik in ihrem ganzen Umfange, oder Beiträge zur Pflanzenkunde. It was reclassified as Racosperma retinodes by Leslie Pedley in 2003 then transferred back to genus Acacia in 2007.

Varieties 
A. retinodes var. retinodes
A. retinodes var. uncifolia

Distribution
In South Australia it is native to the Mount Lofty Ranges from around Mount Clare to Mount Bryan extending down the Fleurieu Peninsula to around Delamere and Normanville in the south and is regarded as a weed further to the south east. It is commonly situated on low ranges and hills as a part of Eucalyptus woodland communities.

Uses 
It is used for environmental management and for ornamental purposes. It produces good quantities of gum and its bark is good for tanning. It has gained the Royal Horticultural Society's Award of Garden Merit. In temperate regions it requires a frost-free sheltered spot with full sun. Indigenous Australians ate the gum, after softening it in water, to relieve chest pains.

The plant is grown as a house plant in temperature climates, where it is resistant to most diseases and pests. It can be grown in almost any well-drained potting soil, but requires ample light and water from spring to summer. Watering should be reduced in the fall and winter. Repotting is generally necessary at the start of each growth season. The plant is usually propagated from seed, but can be propagated from cuttings, though these may take several months to root.

See also
List of Acacia species

References

External links

 Acacia retinodes Photos (Google Images)

 

retinodes
Fabales of Australia
Flora of Tasmania
Flora of Victoria (Australia)
Trees of Australia
Flora of South Australia
Plants described in 1847
Taxa named by Diederich Franz Leonhard von Schlechtendal